Thor's Hammer, or Hljómar, was an Icelandic rock band primarily active in the 1960s.  Outside of Iceland, they are known among music collectors for their rare releases on Parlophone, sung in English and recorded in London for export.  The most famous of these is the 1966 EP Umbarumbamba, regarded as one of the rarest released records in the world and known to fetch prices into the thousands of dollars when a copy surfaces.  Their style can be described as garage rock, fuzz rock, and freakbeat, with noticeable influences from both The Who and The Beatles.

History
Formed in Keflavik in 1963 under the name Hljómar (literally "Chords"), they soon became popular in Iceland at a time when local rock music was a rarity.  By the mid-1960s they were recording in London on Parlophone Records for the international market, including the EP Umbarumbamba, now a valuable collector's item. This record was recorded as a tie-in with a movie starring the band also entitled Umbarumbamba, but the film was not a success.  From these sessions also came the singles "Once" and "If You Knew".  The band even attempted a single entitled "Stay" in the United States on Columbia Records, which was produced by John Simon, known for his work with The Band and Big Brother and the Holding Company's album Cheap Thrills with Janis Joplin.

In 1969 a number of Thor's Hammer members went on to form the prog-flavored band Trúbrot, which recorded four albums until itself splitting in 1973.

Continual interest in the band among collectors of 1960s rock music lead to the 2001 Ace Records compilation album From Keflavik With Love, which collects all of the band's English-language output, including the tracks from Umbarumbamba, "Once", "If You Knew", and "Stay", as well as a number of their Icelandic tracks.

Rúnar Júlíusson died on 5 December 2008 at the age of 63 after going into cardiac arrest.

The group's collected work is featured on the anthology, From Keflavík, With Love, released in 2001 on Big Beat Records.

Band members 
Rúnar Júlíusson (13 April 1945 – 5 December 2008) – vocals, bass
Gunnar Þórðarson – guitar, vocals
Erlingur Björnsson (1966–1969) – guitar, vocals
Engilbert Jensen – vocals, drums
Shady Owens (1968–1969) – vocals
Gunnar Jökull Hákonarson (1968) – drums
Björgvin Halldórsson (1973–1974) – vocals
Birgir Hranfsson (1973–1974) – guitar
Pétur Östlund (1966) – drums

Discography

Studio albums
1967: Hljómar
1968: Hljómar (a second self-titled album)
1974: 74

Compilation albums
Fyrsti kossinn - Hljómar í 50 ár

Singles and EPs
1965: Fyrsti Kossinn / Bláu Augun Þín
1965: Fjögur Ný Lög (EP)
1968: Hljómar (EP)

References

External links 
[ Allmusic entry]
Hljomar biography and discography (in Icelandic)
Thor's Hammer biography and discography (in Icelandic)

Icelandic rock music groups
Keflavík